Sant Baba Bhag Singh University  is a private university located in a rural area near village Khiala, Jalandhar, Punjab, India. It was established in 2015. The university is run by Sant Baba Bhag Singh Memorial Charitable Society.

University Institutes
The SBBS University offer courses in:

 University Institute of Science and Humanities
 University Institute of Commerce and Management
 University Institute of Computer Applications & Information Sciences
 University Institute of Education
 University Institute of Law
 University Institute of Engineering & Technology
University Institute of Nursing

Library  
The Central Library of the University, has an area of 6000 sq.ft. It offers about 15,000 books, 126 journals, and 117 current periodicals, etc. The library has reading halls which can accommodate about 150 users.

Some departments additionally run their own departmental libraries.

References

External links
 Official SBSS University

Private universities in India
Universities in Punjab, India
Education in Jalandhar
Educational institutions established in 2015
2015 establishments in Punjab, India